Michael Macdonald (born June 26, 1987) is an American football coach who is the defensive coordinator for the Baltimore Ravens of the National Football League (NFL).

Early years
Macdonald was born in Boston in 1987. He attended Centennial High School in Roswell, Georgia. He played baseball and football at Centennial but saw limited action as a senior due to injuries.

He next attended the University of Georgia where he studied finance and graduated summa cum laude. While still a student at Georgia, he also coached high school football at Cedar Shoals High School in Athens, Georgia.

Coaching career

Georgia
In May 2010, he joined Mark Richt's coaching staff as a graduate assistant with the Georgia Bulldogs football program. He also served as a safeties and defensive quality control coach at Georgia from 2011 to 2013. In 2013, while coaching at Georgia, he received a master's degree in sports management.

Baltimore Ravens
Macdonald served on John Harbaugh's coaching staff with the Baltimore Ravens for seven seasons from 2014 to 2020.  He was hired as an intern in 2014 and was promoted to defensive assistant in January 2015, defensive backs coach in January 2017, and linebackers coach in January 2018.

Michigan
In January 2021, Macdonald joined Jim Harbaugh's staff at the University of Michigan. He was hired as the defensive coordinator of the Michigan Wolverines football program, making a record breaking $1,000,000 a year in salary.

In Macdonald’s only season at the University of Michigan, the Wolverines posted a top 10 national defense, won the Big Ten Conference Championship, and played in the College Football Playoff (CFP).  The team finished with a national ranking of #3.

Two of Macdonald’s former defensive players at the University of Michigan were selected in the 1st round of the 2022 National Football League Draft on April 28, 2022.

Baltimore Ravens (second stint)
On January 27, 2022, Macdonald was re-hired by the Baltimore Ravens as their defensive coordinator under head coach John Harbaugh, replacing Don Martindale.

References

External links
 Baltimore Ravens bio

1987 births
Living people
Baltimore Ravens coaches
Coaches of American football from Georgia (U.S. state)
Georgia Bulldogs football coaches
High school football coaches in Georgia (U.S. state)
Michigan Wolverines football coaches
National Football League defensive coordinators
People from Roswell, Georgia
Sportspeople from Boston
University of Georgia alumni